Iskul Bukol is a Philippine situational comedy show that aired on the IBC-13 network from October 1978 to 1988. It starred Filipino comedians Tito Sotto, Vic Sotto, and Joey de Leon. The show centered around student life in the fictional Wanbol University.

Main characters
Josélito "Tito" Escalera (Tito Sotto) - one half of the Escalera brothers, who plots harebrained schemes in every episode.
Josémari "Joey" Escalera (Joey de Leon) - the other Escalera sibling. Miss Tapia has a crush on him.
Victorio "Vic" Ungasis (Vic Sotto) - the good-looking and smart teacher's pet with a "chick magnet" personality. The Escaleras often pick on him during class. Later, he became a professor at Wanbol University.
Liwayway Gawgaw Tapia, a.k.a., Miss Tapia (Mely Tagasa) - Wanbol University's professor who often gets on the Escalera brothers' nerves. Although she admires Joey Escalera, Miss Tapia was romantically connected with Mang Tem-i. Vic is her favorite student. Miss Tapia was originally a character in the GMA sitcom Baltic & Co. (1974-1976), also portrayed by Tagasa. Baltic & Co. is based on the newspaper comic strip of the same title created by Roni Santigo. Baltic & Co. and Iskul Bukol are unrelated media franchises.
Artemis Batongbuhay, a.k.a., Mang Tem-i (Bing Angeles) - the dark-complexioned operator of the university's cafeteria. His name is a vesre on the Filipino word "itim" (black or dark), "tim-i" or "tem-i."
Tonette Macho (Anthony Roquel) - the gay student who plays as best friend of the fairest girl in class (Mary and Joey Anson). He is also the nemesis of the Escalera Brothers.
Aling Jacoba or Inang (Dely Atay-Atayan) - Vic's mother from the town of Tiaong, Quezon. Famous for her term of endearment "bunsooyy!" whenever addressing Vic. The root word "bunso" is Tagalog for youngest child.
Sharon Escalera (Sharon Cuneta) - younger sister of Tito and Joey.
Viviana "Bibeth" Belibet (Bibeth Orteza) - Vic's female roommate and fellow student.
Richie "Kabayo" (Richie Reyes) - a fellow student who always copies homework from Vic & Bibeth. He is also an accomplice to the Escalera's comedic pranks.
Mary (Mary Massab) - fellow student.
Joey Anson (Joey Albert) - fellow student. 
Kaye Flores (Kaye Torres) - fellow student.
Redford (Redford White) - Mang Tem-i's houseboy and the cafeteria's waiter. The character was replaced by Jimmy "Big J" (Jimmy Santos) after the departure of White from the series.
Jimmy "Big J" (Jimmy Santos) - replacement of Redford at Mang Tem-i's cafeteria.
Perfecto "Pekto" Pangkista (Ariel Villasanta) - a fellow Wanbol student and part-time waiter at Mang Tem-i's canteen who dresses like a 1970s punk rocker.
Don José Escalera (Rod Navarro) - father of the Escalera siblings.

Sequels

Iskul Bukol: Book 2 (1988–1990)
Iskul Bukol: Book 2 immediately succeeded the original series on IBC-13 and featured the Sietepares brothers, Niño (Niño Muhlach) and Keempee (Keempee de Leon), both nephews of Tito and Joey Escalera. Mely Tagasa, Bing Angeles, Anthony Raquel and Jimmy Santos would reprise their roles from the original series.

Main characters:
Toti Sietepares (Niño Muhlach)
Widyo Sietepares (Keempee de Leon)
Roming Ungasis (Romnick Sarmenta)  
Liwayway Gawgaw Tapia, a.k.a., Miss Tapia (Mely Tagasa)† 
Artemis Batongbuhay, a.k.a., Mang Tem-i (Bing Angeles)† 
Tonette Macho (Anthony Roquel)
RJ (RJ Ledesma) - The new student at Wanbol University who comes from a rich family.
RJ's mom (Nannette Inventor)
Jimmy "Big J" (Jimmy Santos)

Back to Iskul Bukol (1999–2000)
Back to Iskul Bukol is the 1999 sequel to the original Iskul Bukol series and produced by IBC-13 in cooperation with Viva Television. Joey de Leon, Mely Tagasa (cameo) and Bing Angeles (cameo) were the only cast members from the original series to return. De Leon's character, Joey Escalera, is now an English literature professor who decides to go back to Wanbol University to teach and wreak havoc like in the old days. Things could not get any worse when he finds out that one of his students, Ludwig von Tapia (Jeffrey Tam), is actually his and Miss Tapia's love child. The series also starred Val Sotto, Marissa Sanchez, Ruby Rodriguez, Patricia Javier, Gian Sotto (as Jigs), Mausi Wohlfarth (as Mumai), Maui Taylor, and Katya Santos. The show ran for two seasons.

Its canonicity in the Iskul Bukol timeline is in question with the appearance of Gian Sotto and Jeffrey Tam in Iskul Bukol 20 Years After.

Remake
On December 3, 2010, TV5 executive Percy Intalan announced the remake of Iskul Bukol titled Iskul Bukol: Eskwelang Kwela 'To!, a joint project with APT Entertainment. Fred Lo, Sam Y.G., and Alwin Uytingco will play the three main characters, with Erika Padilla and Regine Angeles in supporting roles. The remake would not feature any character from the original series, although it would still be set in Wanbol University. He added that the remake would have partial influences from Glee and How I Met Your Mother. The series premiered the remake on May 24, 2011 and ended on September 27, 2011 after 19 episodes. It was directed by Soxy Topacio and Dante Nico Garcia.

Films
Iskul Bukol the Movie (1978)
Iskul Bukol Freshmen (1980)
The Best of Iskul Bukol: The Movie (1987)
Iskul Bukol: 20 Years After (Ungasis and Escaleras Adventure) (2008)

Music
The eponymous opening theme song was composed by Joey de Leon and Vic Sotto, inspired by Elvis Presley’s “All Shook Up”. A full version of the theme song was released as single by  Tito, Vic & Joey in 1979 and featured in the trio’s Sgt. Pepe (Tito, Vic & Joey, Vol. IV) album. The trio also released an album in 1980 entitled Iskul Bukol, featuring the logo of the television series on its cover.

Mini-reunion in 2007
A Iskul Bukol mini-reunion was celebrated on June 30, 2007 in the GMA-7 show Eat Bulaga!'s Bulagaan portion. Mely Tagasa, Tito Sotto, Joey de Leon and Vic Sotto appeared, reprising their roles from Iskul Bukol.

Influence
In the GMA-7 documentary show I-Witness, presenter Jay Taruc revisited Iskul Bukol and the Philippines’ comedy trio (Tito, Vic, and Joey) in a 2007 retrospective episode titled "Wanbol University" and discovered that TVJ merchandise was still a hit.

See also
List of programs previously broadcast by Intercontinental Broadcasting Corporation
List of programs aired by The 5 Network

References

External links
 

1978 Philippine television series debuts
1988 Philippine television series endings
Philippine television sitcoms
1970s Philippine television series
1980s Philippine television series
Intercontinental Broadcasting Corporation original programming
1970s sitcoms
1980s teen sitcoms
Filipino-language television shows